The Sunair Sunlight is a German ultralight trike electric aircraft, designed and produced by Sunair UG of Scheidegg, Bavaria. The aircraft is supplied as a complete ready-to-fly-aircraft.

Design and development
The Sunlight was designed as an electric powered, self-launching motorglider for the German  class. It features a cable-braced hang glider-style high-wing, weight-shift controls, a single-seat open cockpit with the pilot accommodated in recumbent position fabric zip-up pod, tricycle landing gear and a single engine in pusher configuration.

The aircraft is made from bolted-together aluminum tubing, with its single surface wing covered in Dacron sailcloth. The wing is supported by a single tube-type kingpost and uses an "A" frame weight-shift control bar. The powerplant is a  Elektromotor electric motor, recharged in flight by small solar cells.

Specifications (Sunlight)

See also
Sunair Magic

References

External links

Sunlight
2010s German sport aircraft
2010s German ultralight aircraft
Single-engined pusher aircraft
Electric aircraft
Ultralight trikes